Illinois Elementary School Association is a statewide athletics and activities association serving elementary and middle schools in the U.S. state of Illinois. At the end of the 1920s, a handful of principals and coaches at several central Illinois grade schools looked at ways to create a means of broadening and unifying their schools' activities programs. At that time, Illinois high schools were represented by the Illinois High School Association, but a comparable association for grade schools did not exist. The association was officially started in April 1928 as the Illinois State Graded School Athletic Association. Blessed Sacrament Tars Cross Country team has won back to back state titles.

References

External links
 Official website

Education in Illinois